Psalm 13 is the 13th psalm of the Book of Psalms, beginning in English in the King James Version (KJV): "How long, O Lord". The Book of Psalms is part of the third section of the Hebrew Bible, and a book of the Christian Old Testament. In the Greek Septuagint and the Latin Vulgate, this psalm is Psalm 12 in a slightly different numbering system. In Latin, it is known as "Usquequo Domine".

The psalm forms a regular part of Jewish, Catholic, Lutheran, Anglican and other Protestant liturgies.

Background and themes
Theodoret theorized that this psalm was composed by David when his son Absalom conspired against him. However, Charles Spurgeon asserts that any attempt to link it to a specific incident is conjecture; rather, the psalm gives voice to feelings that arise in any of the many trials that a person undergoes in life. 

Jewish and Christian commentators note the three-part structure of this psalm, with verses 2–3 in the Hebrew (1-2 in the KJV) relating to David's complaint, verses 4–5 in the Hebrew (3–4 in the KJV) expressing David's prayer, and verse 6 in the Hebrew (5-6 in the KJV) describing David's salvation. A. G. Brown asserts that prayer is the turning point between mourning and rejoicing.

Spurgeon notes that the repetition of the words "How long?" four times in this psalm resemble cries; he creatively refers to this psalm as the "How Long Psalm" or the "Howling Psalm".

Text

Hebrew Bible version
Following is the Hebrew text of Psalm 13:

King James Version
 How long wilt thou forget me, O ? for ever? how long wilt thou hide thy face from me?
 How long shall I take counsel in my soul, having sorrow in my heart daily? how long shall mine enemy be exalted over me?
 Consider and hear me, O  my God: lighten mine eyes, lest I sleep the sleep of death;
 Lest mine enemy say, I have prevailed against him; and those that trouble me rejoice when I am moved.
 But I have trusted in thy mercy; my heart shall rejoice in thy salvation.

Uses

Judaism
Verse 6 in the Hebrew is recited in the morning prayer service during Pesukei dezimra.

According to the Chasam Sofer and the Siddur Sfas Emes, the entire psalm is recited as a prayer for the well-being of a sick person.

Catholic
Around 530, St. Benedict of Nursia chose this psalm to be recited for the office of prime on Thursday in the Rule of St. Benedict. In the modern Liturgy of the Hours, Psalm 13 is recited or sung to the Office for Midday Prayer on the Tuesday of the first week of the four-weekly cycle.

Book of Common Prayer
In the Church of England's Book of Common Prayer, Psalm 13 is appointed to be read on the evening of the second day of the month.

Musical settings 
Heinrich Schütz wrote a setting of a paraphrase of Psalm 13 in German, "Ach Herr, wie lang willst du denn noch", SWV 109, for the Becker Psalter, published first in 1628. In 1692, Michel-Richard de Lalande wrote his great Latin motet (S. 40) for the offices of the Royal Chapel of Versailles. His contemporary Henry Desmarest also composed a grand motet on this psalm. Marc-Antoine Charpentier set around 1685 one "Usquequo Domine" H.196, for 4 voices, recorder, flutes, and continuo. In German, the psalm was set to music by Johannes Brahms for women's choir in three voices, "Herr, wie lange willst du". Friedrich Kiel set verses as No. 6 of his Six Motets, Op. 82, published in 1883. Franz Liszt scored it for a tenor soloist as the psalmist, mixed choir, and orchestra.

The Canadian Christian singer-songwriter and worship leader Brian Doerksen wrote with others a song called 'How long, O Lord'. The psalm was set by Goran Trajkoski for a 2013 production, Eternal House, at the Macedonian National Theatre.

References

Cited sources

External links 

 
 
 Text of Psalm 13 according to the 1928 Psalter
 Psalms Chapter 13 text in Hebrew and English, mechon-mamre.org
 For the leader. A psalm of David. / How long, LORD? Will you utterly forget me? text and footnotes, usccb.org United States Conference of Catholic Bishops
 Psalm 13:1 introduction and text, biblestudytools.com
 Psalm 13 – Enlighten My Eyes enduringword.com
 Psalm 13 / Refrain: I love the Lord, for he has heard the voice of my supplication. Church of England
 Psalm 13 at biblegateway.com

013
Works attributed to David